Sveti Petar (lit. "Saint Peter") may refer to:

 Sveti Petar (island), an uninhabited Croatian island in the Adriatic Sea
 Sveti Petar Čvrstec, a village in Koprivnica-Križevci County, Croatia
 Sveti Petar Orehovec, a village and a municipality in the Koprivnica-Križevci County in Croatia
 Sveti Petar u Šumi, a village and municipality in Istria County, Croatia
 Sveti Petar (Makarska, Croatia), a peninsula at the port entrance of Makarska